Benjamin Šeško (born 31 May 2003) is a Slovenian professional footballer who plays as a forward for Austrian Bundesliga club Red Bull Salzburg and the Slovenia national team. He will join German Bundesliga club RB Leipzig in July 2023.

Šeško joined Red Bull Salzburg aged 16 in 2019 from Domžale. He was loaned to the Salzburg's reserve team FC Liefering for two seasons, where he scored 22 goals in 44 games in the second tier of Austrian football. He made his first-team debut for Red Bull Salzburg in January 2021 and has gone on to win two Austrian Bundesliga titles and one Austrian Cup.

Šeško played 25 games for Slovenia at youth international level. He became the youngest ever player for the senior Slovenia national team when he made his debut in June 2021 at the age of 18 years and 1 day. He scored his first goal for the national team in October 2021, which made him Slovenia's youngest ever goalscorer.

Club career

Early career
Šeško began his career at his hometown club Radeče when he was in the first grade. He then spent one year with Rudar Trbovlje in the under-11 selection, before returning to Radeče. In 2016 he transferred to Krško, where he played for the under-15s and under-17s. In the 2017–18 season, he scored 59 goals in 23 matches for the under-15s. In 2018, Šeško joined Domžale, where he stayed for one season.

Red Bull Salzburg
At the age of 16, on 3 June 2019, Šeško signed a three-year professional contract with Red Bull Salzburg. He debuted with Red Bull Salzburg in a 3–0 Austrian Football Bundesliga win over TSV Hartberg on 30 January 2021.

Loan to FC Liefering
Immediately after signing with Red Bull Salzburg, he was moved to their farm club FC Liefering, competing in the Austrian Second League. In the 2020–21 season, he scored 21 goals in 29 appearances and became the league's second-best goalscorer. He scored most of his goals in the final part of the season, scoring 13 goals in the last 7 rounds.

RB Leipzig
On 9 August 2022, RB Leipzig announced that Šeško would join them on 1 July 2023, on a five-year contract until 2028, for a reported transfer fee of around €24 million.

International career

Eligible for Slovenia and Bosnia and Herzegovina (due to his mother hailing from Doboj), Šeško opted for the former, having represented the country at the under-15, under-16, under-17, and under-19 levels. He made his under-19 debut in a friendly game against Austria in September 2020.

In May 2021, Šeško was called up by the senior team manager Matjaž Kek for a pair of friendlies in June 2021. He debuted for Slovenia in a 1–1 friendly tie with North Macedonia on 1 June 2021. At the time he was 18 years and 1 day old and became the youngest debutant in the national team, surpassing the previous record set by Petar Stojanović seven years earlier. On 8 October 2021, Šeško scored his first goal for Slovenia in the 2022 FIFA World Cup qualification match against Malta, becoming Slovenia's youngest ever goalscorer at the age of 18 years, 4 months and 8 days. During the 2022–23 UEFA Nations League B campaign, Šeško helped Slovenia avoid relegation to League C with two decisive goals. He provided an assist and scored the winning goal in a 2–1 victory over Norway on 24 September 2022, and also scored in a 1–1 draw against Sweden three days later. The goal against Sweden was described as a "wonder goal" by the media, and was nominated as one of the best goals of the matchday by UEFA.

Career statistics

Club

International

Scores and results list Slovenia's goal tally first, score column indicates score after each Šeško goal.

Honours
Red Bull Salzburg
Austrian Bundesliga: 2020–21, 2021–22
Austrian Cup: 2021–22

Individual
Slovenian Footballer of the Year: 2022
Slovenian Youth Footballer of the Year: 2021, 2022

References

External links

 
 NZS National Team profile 
 NZS Club profile 
 

2003 births
Living people
People from Lower Carniola
Slovenian people of Bosnia and Herzegovina descent
Slovenian footballers
Slovenia youth international footballers
Slovenia international footballers
Association football forwards
FC Red Bull Salzburg players
FC Liefering players
2. Liga (Austria) players
Austrian Football Bundesliga players
Slovenian expatriate footballers
Expatriate footballers in Austria
Slovenian expatriate sportspeople in Austria